Metzinger (German for "pedigree" or "person") is a surname. Notable people with the surname include:

 Ann Metzinger (1931–2022), American nutritionist
 Jean Metzinger (1883–1956), French painter
 Kraig Metzinger (born 1963), US actor
 Thomas Metzinger (born 1958), German philosopher

German-language surnames